Public utility districts (PUDs) in the U.S. state of Washington serve about one million of the state's electric customers in 26 counties. Public utility districts are regulated by Title 54 of the Revised Code of Washington. Most PUDs provide electricity; some provide other services in addition. The first PUD was Mason No. 1, created by voters on November 6, 1934, serving  fewer than 5,000 customers.

Asotin County Public Utility District
Benton County Public Utility District
Chelan County Public Utility District
Clallam County Public Utility District
Clark Public Utilities
Cowlitz County Public Utility District
Douglas County Public Utility District
Ferry County Public Utility District
Franklin County Public Utility District
Grant County Public Utility District
Grays Harbor County Public Utility District
Jefferson County Public Utility District
Kitsap County Public Utility District (water and telecommunications only)
Kittitas County Public Utility District
Klickitat County Public Utility District
Lewis County Public Utility District
Mason County Public Utility District No. 1
Mason County Public Utility District No. 3
Okanogan County Public Utility District
Pacific County Public Utility District
Pend Oreille County Public Utility District
Skagit County Public Utility District (water, sewer, telecommunications only)
Skamania County Public Utility District
Snohomish County Public Utility District
Stevens County Public Utility District  (water and sewer only)
Thurston County Public Utility District (water only)
Wahkiakum County Public Utility District
Whatcom County Public Utility District

See also
Energy Northwest, a PUD consortium

References

External links
Washington Public Utility Districts Association

Washington (state)-related lists